The Ministry of Energy is the Israeli government ministry responsible for energy and water infrastructure. The ministry has changed names several times since its establishment.

The ministerial post was established in 1977, succeeding the position of Development Ministry, which had been scrapped three years earlier.

Names
The Ministry of Energy has been called the following names:
 Ministry of Energy and Infrastructure (משרד האנרגיה והתשתיות) – 1977–1996
 Ministry of National Infrastructures (משרד התשתיות הלאומיות) – 1996–2011
 Ministry of Energy and Water Resources (משרד האנרגיה והמים) – 2011–2013
 Ministry of National Infrastructures, Energy and Water (משרד התשתיות הלאומיות, האנרגיה והמים) – 2013–2017
 Ministry of Energy (משרד האנרגיה) – 2017–

List of ministers

Deputy ministers

References

External links
Official website
All Ministers in the Ministry of Energy and Infrastructure Knesset website

Energy
Ministry of Energy
Energy
Public works ministries
1977 establishments in Israel